Marcel·lí Antúnez Roca (Moià, Barcelona, 13 December 1959) is an artist from Spain who uses digital technologies in the fields of mechatronic performance and installation art.

Artistic career

La Fura dels Baus (1979–1989) 
While pursuing his studies in fine arts in the University of Barcelona, Marcel•lí Antúnez co-founded the collective La Fura dels Baus with Carles Padrissa, Pere Tantinyà, Quico Palomar, and Teresa Puig. He was part of the collective from 1979 until 1989 as a performer, musician and artistic coordinator in the first three performances of the group: the trilogy Accions (1984), Suz /o /Suz (1985) and Tier Mon (1988).

Los Rinos (1985–1992) 
With Sergi Caballero and Pau Nubiola, he founded the group Los Rinos, initially focusing on graffiti. Later, his activity extended to painting, video action performance, the concert and wall installation, such as Rinodigestió (1987), a system of interconnected wooden and glass boxes containing decaying organic matter.

Solo career (1992– present) 
Since 1992, Marcel•lí Antúnez has developed a series of works in various formats exploring biology, technology, society, and culture. Using drawing and painting as the basis of his work, he used techniques such as interactive sculpture of both organic and artificial materials, growing microorganisms, and interactive performance art incorporating cinematic elements such as animation, as well as multiple projection screens and sound systems.

Mechatronic performances and expanded cinema 
Epizoo (1994)
Afasia (1998)
POL (2002)
Transpermia (2003)
Protomembrana (2006)
Hipermembrana (2007)
Cotrone (2010)
Pseudo (2012)

Installations 
JoAn, l'home de carn (1992)
La vida sin amor no tiene sentido (1993)
Agar (1999)
Alfabeto (1999)
Requiem (1999)
Human Machine (2001)
Metzina (2004)
Tantal (2004)
DMD Europa (2007)
Metamembrana (2009)

Exhibitions 
Epifania (1999)
Interattività furiosa (2007)
43 somni de la raó (2007)
Outras peles (2008)
Hibridum Bestiarium (2008)
Salón de Juegos (2009)

Films 
Retrats (1993)
Frontón. El hombre navarro va a la Luna (1993)
Satèl•lits Obscens (2000)
El Dibuixant (2005) IMDB file
El Peix Sebastiano (2012)

Terminology 
Marcel•lí Antúnez has described his work using some unique terminology:

Dreskeleton: an active scenic component using software created by the artist for the purpose of controlling the dynamics and interactions between the different elements of scene.

Sistematurgia: dramaturgy of computer systems.

Fembrana: costumes with range, position and touch sensors embedded in latex prosthetics.

Awards 
First prize in the Étrange festival (París, 1994), for Frontón
Best New Media en Nouveau Cinéma et Nouveaux Médias (Montreal, 1999), for Afasia
Max award to the alternative theatre (España, 2001), for Afasia
FAD award (Barcelona, 2001), for Afasia
Honorable Mention in Prix Ars Electronica (2003), for POL
Ciutat de Barcelona award in multimedia (2004), for Mondo Antúnez

See also
 Shu Lea Cheang
 Marco Donnarumma
 Neil Harbisson
 God helmet
 Stelarc
 Kevin Warwick

Bibliography

References

Giannachi, Gabriella. Virtual Theatres: An Introduction

External links
Official artist website 
Artist videos
About the documentary El Dibuixant (Avui newspaper, in Catalan)
About the exhibition of Epifanía
About Metamembrana (Avui newspaper, in Catalan)
Book review of Pere Salabert about the life and work of the artist

1959 births
Living people
Artists from Catalonia
Spanish installation artists
Spanish performance artists
Spanish contemporary artists